Nedim Hadžić (born 19 March 1999) is a Bosnian professional footballer who plays as a centre-forward for Slovenian PrvaLiga club Radomlje.

Career statistics

Club

Honours
Sarajevo
Bosnian Cup runner up: 2016–17

References

External links
Nedim Hadžić at Sofascore

1999 births
Living people
Footballers from Sarajevo
Bosniaks of Bosnia and Herzegovina
Bosnia and Herzegovina footballers
Bosnia and Herzegovina youth international footballers
Bosnia and Herzegovina under-21 international footballers
Association football forwards
FK Sarajevo players
FK Mladost Doboj Kakanj players
NK Slaven Belupo players
FK Sloboda Tuzla players
NK Radomlje players
Premier League of Bosnia and Herzegovina players
Croatian Football League players
Slovenian PrvaLiga players
Bosnia and Herzegovina expatriate footballers
Expatriate footballers in Croatia
Expatriate footballers in Slovenia
Bosnia and Herzegovina expatriate sportspeople in Croatia
Bosnia and Herzegovina expatriate sportspeople in Slovenia